The Valley Power Peaking Facility is an open cycle, gas turbine power station at Traralgon in the Latrobe Valley in Victoria, Australia.  It is owned and operated by Snowy Hydro.

The plant was developed by Edison Mission Energy and Contact Energy in 2001 and 2002.  The gas turbine units were relocated from the Stratford and Whirinaki power stations in New Zealand.

In 2005, it was sold to International Power and Mitsui & Co Ltd who onsold the plant to Snowy Hydro.

See also
 List of power stations in Victoria

References

External links
 Snowy Hydro website

Natural gas-fired power stations in Victoria (Australia)